Understanding Privacy is a 2008 book on privacy by Daniel J. Solove. The book gives a modern history of the concept of privacy particularly as it is discussed by philosophers and legal theorists. It provides a framework of many people's concept of privacy and the author's own theory of the outline of what privacy covers.

Reviews
The book was reviewed by various commentators.

One reviewer said the book "is a vital text; a must read for all who follow, or engage in, privacy debates."

References

External links

2008 non-fiction books
American non-fiction books
Harvard University Press books
Works about privacy